Stainsby may refer to:

 Stainsby, Derbyshire, a village in Derbyshire, England
 Stainsby, Lincolnshire, a location in England
 Stainsby, North Yorkshire, an abandoned village in England
 Stainsby procedure, a form of arthroplasty

People with the surname 
 John Stainsby (1937–2000), an English professional footballer
 Les Stainsby (1898–1942), an Australian rules footballer